Hugo Eisig (1847, Baden – 10 February 1920) was a German marine zoologist.

Hugo Eisig was a student of  Ernst Haeckel. He served as a first assistant (1872–1909), then as a vice-director at Stazione Zoologica in Naples.

Eisig was an expert on polychaete worms and in 1887 published "Die Capitelliden des Golfes von Neapel und der angrenzenden Meeres-Abschnitte: eine Monographie" (Volume 16 of Fauna und Flora des Golfes von Neapel). He also wrote "Zur Systematik, Anatomie und Morphologie der Ariciiden nebst Beiträgen zur generellen Systematik"; Mitteilungen aus der Zoologischen Station zu Neapel, 21(6): 153–600 (1914).

Taxa 
 Centroderes eisigii (Zelinka, 1928)
 Cerebratulus eisigii (Hubrecht, 1880)

References 
petymol Biographical Etymology of Marine Organism Names. E & F

19th-century German zoologists
1920 deaths
1847 births
20th-century German zoologists